NW2 may refer to:

EMD NW2, a locomotive
NW postcode area, a group of postcode districts covering part of northwest London
Neverwinter Nights 2, a role-playing video game
National Waterway 2 (India), a section of the Brahmaputra River
Peck NW2, a peak in British Columbia, Canada